The Devil Knows My Name is the third solo studio album by American heavy metal guitarist John 5. It was released on April 3, 2007, by 60 Cycle Hum.

Guest appearances
Several artists including Joe Satriani, Eric Johnson, Jim Root (Slipknot, ex-Stone Sour), Tommy Clufetos (ex-Alice Cooper, ex-Rob Zombie, Ozzy Osbourne), Piggy D (Rob Zombie), and Matt Bissonette (David Lee Roth) made guest appearances on the album. Zakk Wylde (Black Label Society, Ozzy Osbourne) was reported to have an appearance on the album, but it was canceled due to scheduling problems.

Track listing

"The Werewolf of Westeria" was the nickname used for the serial killer and blood maniac Albert Fish.
"Black Widow of La Porte" is a reference to female serial killer Belle Gunness of La Porte, Indiana.
"Harold Rollings Hymn" is an edited version of a song Danny Rolling, a convicted serial killer, sang before he was executed.
"Dead Art in Plainfield" references serial killer Ed Gein, who worked in the area of Plainfield, Wisconsin.
"July 31st (The Last Stand)" is a reference to the last victim of David Berkowitz, who was killed on the 31 July.
"27 Needles" is also a reference to Albert Fish. In an infamous x-ray, it was revealed that the serial killer had 27 needles shoved into his pelvis.

Personnel
John 5 – lead guitars, bass, banjo, production album 
Piggy D – graphic design, photography
Matt Bissonette – bass guitar
Sid Riggs – drums, production, engineering, mixing, programming
Tommy Clufetos – drums
Undercurrent Studios – Mastering
Gabrielle Geiselman – photography
VQPR/Nancy Sayle – marketing album

References

Best album John 5

John 5 (guitarist) albums
2007 albums
Instrumental albums